Selton Figueiredo Mello (born 30 December 1972) is a Brazilian actor and director. Since his childhood, he acted on TV shows. Now he works on TV, movies and theater. Throughout his career, he developed a strong and solid experience in cinema, producing and directing movies and videoclips, and being publicly and critically acclaimed for it. The actor hosted Tarja Preta, a TV show about culture and independent movies, from 2004 until 2008.

Life and career 
Selton was born in Passos (State of Minas Gerais), the son of Selva (housewife) and Dalton Melo (bank employee). His brother Danton Mello is an actor as well. Selton's parents are both from Minas Gerais State. After Selton was born his parents moved to São Paulo, where he lived until the age of 11. In São Paulo, Selton attended "Colégio Aclimação". At 11 years of age he was invited to star on a soap opera at Rede Globo Television, so he moved with his entire family to Rio de Janeiro, where he still lives.

He played André in the Brazilian film To the left of the father which was directed by Luiz Fernando Carvalho and based on the eponymous novel by Raduan Nassar. He has also played João da Ega in Os Maias, also directed by Luiz Fernando Carvalho, based on the eponymous novel by Eça de Queiroz.

Beyond that, Selton Mello has many memorable performances in his trajectory, such as the roles he played in the movies Lisbela and the Prisoner (Lisbela e o Prisioneiro - more than 3.5 million tickets sold); Auto da Compadecida (more than 2.5 million tickets sold), by Guel Arraes; Drained (O cheiro do Ralo), by Heitor Dhalia; and My Name Ain't Johnny (Meu Nome Não É Johnny - more than 2.5 million tickets sold), by Mauro Lima and Four Days in September by Bruno Barreto (nominated for Best Foreign Language Film for the 1997 Oscar Awards).

Selton Mello's acting skills were awarded several times in national and international festivals such as the Havana Film Festival (Cuba), Brasília International Film Festival (Brazil), Lleida Latin-American Film Festival (Spain) and the Lima Latin American Film Festival (Peru) in which he was awarded for his performance in To the Left of the Father. He also won the Cinema Brazil Grand Prize (Grande Prêmio do Cinema Brasileiro) for Lisbela and the Prisoner and the best actor award for My Name Ain't Johnny granted by both the Cinema Brazil Grand Prize and the Miami International Film Festival; and the best actor award for Drained, granted by the Rio International Film Festival (Festival do Rio), Punta Del Este International Film Festival and by the Guadalajara International Film Festival.

Selton is also a screenwriter, editor and musician. After he developed a solid career as an actor, he began to work on the other side of the camera as a much acclaimed and in-demand director. He began directing video clips, documentaries and TV shows. His debut in film directing was in 2006 with the short film entitled When the Time Falls, selected for competitive screenings at the Gramado Film Fest (Festival de Gramado), Rio International Film Festival, São Paulo International Film Festival and the Guadalajara Film Festival.

The award-winning movie December, acclaimed by critics in Brasil and worldwide, marked his debut as a director and has amassed more than 20 awards at various festivals, such as the Paulínia Film Festival (Festival Paulínia de Cinema), Goiania and Curitiba Film Festivals in Brazil.

He also received the Special Jury Prize in Imola/Italy, three awards at the Los Angeles Brazilian Film Festival, including the Best Director and the Best Screenplay award at the 7th Cine Cero Latitud Festival (Festival Cero Latitud de Ecuador), Best Cinematography at the Lima Latin American Film Festival, and in the XI Ibero-American Film Festival of Santa Cruz.

In 2011, he acted and co-directed the TV Series The Invisible Woman (based on the eponymous film) which won the International Emmy Award in 2012 for Best TV Comedy of the Year.

In 2012, he directed Sessão de Terapia, the Brazilian version of the much celebrated TV series In Treatment (Bi Tipul), written by Hagai Levi (originally for Israeli TV and then consequently seen in over 25 countries).

His second film feature, The Clown (in which he directed, co-wrote, co-edited and played the lead character), launched in October 2011, was selected as the Brazilian entry for the Best Foreign Language Oscar at the 85th Academy Awards, but it did not make the final shortlist. This film hit the milestone of 1.5 million viewers, and was received with great enthusiasm by critics, receiving over 40 national and international awards, including Best Director in Paulínia, APCA (Paulista Association of Art Critics - Associação Paulista de Críticos de Arte) and the 38th SESC Film Fest - where it was also awarded as best film (both by the jury and the public selection). He was further enshrined in the Cinema Brazil Grand Prize (Grande Prêmio do Cinema Brasileiro 2012), having won 12 categories, - a record that assured the film a place in the history of the most successful Brazilian films.

Filmography

Television
A Mulher Invisível (2011)
Sinhá Moça (1986)
Pedra sobre Pedra (1992)
Olho no Olho (1993)
Tropicaliente (1994)
A Próxima Vítima (1995)
A Indomada (1997)
O Auto da Compadecida (1999)
Força de um Desejo (1999)
Os Maias (2001)
Caramuru - A Invenção do Brasil (2001)
Os Aspones (2004)
O Sistema (2007)
A Cura (2010)
Treze Dias Longe do Sol (2018)
O Mecanismo (2018)

Awards
The Clown (MOVIE)
Best Director of Fiction - Menina de Ouro (Paulínia Film Festival 2011)
Best Director - Prêmio APCA (Paulista Association of Art Critics)
Best Actor - Prêmio QUEM
Best Director - Prêmio Melhores do Ano SESC SP
Best Director - Festival de Cinema da Lapa
Best Picture Montage - Prêmio ABC (Associação Brasileira de Cinematografia)
Best Director - Prêmio Contigo de Cinema Nacional
Best Actor - Prêmio Contigo
Best Actor - BRAFFTV - Brazilian Film & TV Festival of Toronto
Best Actor -  Cinema Brazil Grand Prize 2012
Best Director - Cinema Brazil Grand Prize 2012
Best Screenplay, Original - Cinema Brazil Grand Prize 2012
Best Editing - Cinema Brazil Grand Prize 2012
Audience Award - Huelva Latin American Film Festival 2012

Jean Charles (MOVIE)
Best actor - Quem Magazine 2009

Feliz Natal (MOVIE)
Best director - Paulinia Film Festival 2008
Best director - Goiania Film Festival 2008
Best director - 2nd Brazilian Film Festival - Los Angeles, EUA 2009

Meu Nome Nao é Johnny (MOVIE)
Best actor - Cineport Festival 2009
Best actor - Prêmio Vivo de Cinema Brasileiro 2009
Best Actor - Cinema Brazil Grand Prize 2009
Best actor - 12th Brazilian Film Festival of Miami 2008
Best actor - Prêmio Contigo de Cinema 2008
Best actor - Prêmio Qualidade Brasil 2008
Best actor - Toronto Brazilian Film Festival 2008
Best actor - Quem magazine award 2008

O Cheiro do Ralo (MOVIE)
Best actor -  Prêmio APCA 2007
Best actor - Rio Film Festival 2006
Best actor - Punta Del Leste International Film Festival
Best actor - Guadalajara, Mexico XXII Film Festival
Best actor - Sesc-Sated award, Minas Gerais
Best actor - Film Festival - Quito, Ecuador

O Coronel e o Lobisomem (MOVIE)
Best Supporting Actor - Contigo Award Cinema 2006

Lisbela e o Prisioneiro
Best Actor - Cinema Brazil Grand Prize 2004

Lavoura Arcaica (MOVIE)
Best Actor - Qualidade Brasil Award 2001
Best Actor - Lleida Latin-American Film Festival 2002
Best Actor - Lima Latin American Film Festival 2002
Best Actor - Havana Film Festival 2001
Best Actor - Brazilia Festival of Brazilian Cinema 2001

Árido Movie (MOVIE)
Best supporting actor: Recife Film Festival
Best supporting actor: Qualidade Brasil Award
Best supporting actor: Cineport Film Festival

Os Maias (TV Serie)
Best Actor in a Special Project - Qualidade Brasil Award 2001

A indomada (TV Soap Opera)
Best Supporting Actor - Contigo Award 1998

References

External links 

 

Living people
1972 births
Brazilian male actors
Brazilian film directors

Publishers name 

Kaleu Silva de Alencar